Andy Booth (born 2 June 1974) is a New Zealand racing driver.

A relatively late starter in motorsport, Booth never raced karts, and only competed in a handful of Formula Ford events in New Zealand before heading to the UK where he spent several years successfully campaigning in the Slick 50 Formula Ford Championship, and later in the Formula Palmer Audi series. He has also competed in Indy Lights in the US and Formula Holden in Australia.

Booth won the Tasman Series (Formula Holden) in 2000, driving for the NRC International team, also taking the New Zealand Grand Prix and Denny Hulme Memorial Trophy in the same year. Booth then briefly competed in Indy Lights in the US,

Since 2001 he has been competing in the NZ V8s exclusively, winning the series in 03/04 and 04/05, and consistently placing in the top 6. Previously a 'part-time' driver, as of 2007 Booth now drives full-time and manages the New Zealand operations of Tasman Motorsport.

In 2009 Andy became the presenter of NZV8 TV.

Racing record

Career summary

References 

1974 births
Living people
New Zealand racing drivers
Formula Palmer Audi drivers
Sportspeople from Auckland
Formula Holden drivers
Indy Lights drivers
V8SuperTourer drivers
Nürburgring 24 Hours drivers